Addison Cresswell may refer to:
 Addison Cresswell (politician) (Addison John Baker Cresswell; 1788–1879), Member of Parliament
 Joe Baker-Cresswell (Addison Joe Baker-Cresswell; 1901–1997), Royal Navy officer
 Addison Cresswell (Addison Lee Cresswell; 1960–2013), talent agent